Air Marshal B Chandra Sekhar, AVSM is an officer in the Indian Air Force. He is currently serving as the commandant of the Air Force Academy. He assumed the office on 8 March 2022 succeeding Air Marshal Sreekumar Prabhakaran. Previously, he served as the Senior Air Staff Officer - Training Command.

Early life and education
B Chandra Sekhar is a native of Telangana. He is an alumnus of Defence Services Staff College, Wellington, National Defence Academy, Khadagwasla, Flying Instructors School, College of Defence Management and National Defence College, New Delhi.

Career
B Chandra Sekhar was commissioned in the flying branch of the Indian Air Force on 21 December 1984. He has over 5400 hours of incident free flying on various  aircraft.

B Chandra Sekhar is a qualified flying instructor and has the accolade of the landing a medium-lift helicopter in Siachen Glacier.

With a long career of 38 years. He has served as appointments such as Ops IIB in the Eastern Sector, Principal Director (Administration) in Strategic Forces Command. He was instrumental in induction of Chinook helicopters and Rafale jet in the Eastern Air Command of the Indian Air Force.

As an Air Vice Marshal, he served as the Senior Officer-in-charge Administration for both Southern Air Command and Eastern Air Command.

He served as the Senior Air Staff Officer - Training Command till 7 March 2022.

Honours and decorations 
During his career, B Chandra Sekhar has been awarded the Ati Vishisht Seva Medal in 2020.

Personal life 
B Chandra Shekhar is married to Mrs B Komala, who is an experienced banker. They are blessed with a daughter and a son who are both commissioned officers in the Indian Air Force.

References 

Indian Air Force air marshals
Recipients of the Ati Vishisht Seva Medal
Year of birth missing (living people)
Living people
Commandants of the Indian Air Force Academy
College of Defence Management alumni
National Defence Academy (India) alumni
National Defence College, India alumni
Defence Services Staff College alumni